Portland Mills is an unincorporated community in Clinton Township, Putnam County, in the U.S. state of Indiana.

History
A post office was established at Portland Mills in 1837, and remained in operation until it was discontinued in 1904.

Geography

References

Unincorporated communities in Putnam County, Indiana
Unincorporated communities in Indiana